The London Muddy Waters Sessions is a studio album by Muddy Waters, released in 1972 on Chess Records. A follow-up to 1971's The London Howlin' Wolf Sessions, the concept was to combine American bluesmen with British blues/rock stars. The album was an attempt to capitalise on the increasing popularity of traditional blues music and blues artists in Britain.

The London Muddy Waters Sessions won the 1972 Grammy Award for Best Ethnic or Traditional Folk Recording; it marked the second of six times that Muddy Waters would win that award.

The Players
The album features Waters on slide and acoustic guitar, backed by Sammy Lawhorn and Rory Gallagher on guitar, Carey Bell Harrington on harmonica, Rick Grech on bass, Georgie Fame (credited as "George Fortune") and Steve Winwood on piano and organ, Mitch Mitchell from Jimi Hendrix Experience and Herbie Lovelle on drums and Rosetta Hightower on vocals, Ernie Royal and Joe Newman on trumpet, Garnett Brown on trombone and Seldon Powell on tenor saxophone.

Irish blues-rocker Gallagher, who began a successful solo career following the demise of his trio, Taste, played on three tracks, providing solos on "Young Fashion Ways" and two others. Winwood reprised his keyboard role on the Howlin' Wolf sessions, making appearances on three tracks. Fame, a swinging-jazz-blues player who went on to collaborating with Van Morrison, played on the remaining tracks.

Mitchell, who had worked with Georgie Fame's Blues Flames prior to joining the Jimi Hendrix Experience and drew his greatest inspiration from jazzmen such as Elvin Jones, played on most of the album. On the shuffles like "I'm Ready" and "Blind Man Blues", the drummer is New York session veteran Lovelle.

Grech was best known as one-fourth of Blind Faith, together with Winwood. It is also noteworthy that Blind Faith included two ex-Cream members, Ginger Baker and Eric Clapton – the latter having played on The London Howlin' Wolf Sessions, while Grech had previously been a member of Traffic, another band featuring Winwood.

Blues harp man Carey Bell was essential. Like Muddy, Bell was born in Mississippi and came of age in Chicago; like Lawhorn, he was a long-time member of Muddy Waters' band, having previously worked with John Lee Hooker, Eddie Taylor and Earl Hooker. Bell alternated between a standard Marine Band harp and the big double-key chromatic harp which was his specialty.

Track listing
"Blind Man Blues" (Lafayette Leake) 	 – 3:30
"Key to the Highway" (McKinley Morganfield) 	 – 2:24
"Young Fashioned Ways" (Willie Dixon) 	 – 4:22
"I'm Gonna Move to the Outskirts of Town" (William Weldon) 	 – 3:54
"Who's Gonna Be Your Sweet Man When I'm Gone" (McKinley Morganfield)	 – 5:03
"Walkin' Blues" (Willie Dixon) 	 – 3:00
"I'm Ready" (Willie Dixon) 	 – 4:08
"Sad Sad Day" (McKinley Morganfield) 	 – 5:15
"I Don't Know Why" (Willie Dixon) 	 – 4:00

Personnel
Muddy Waters – slide guitar, vocals
Sammy Lawhorn – guitar
Rory Gallagher – guitar
Carey Bell Harrington – harmonica
Rick Grech – bass
George Fortune – piano, organ
Steve Winwood – piano, organ
Mitch Mitchell – drums
Herbie Lovelle – drums 
Rosetta Hightower – vocals on "Blind Man Blues"
Ernie Royal – trumpet 
Joe Newman – trumpet 
Garnett Brown – trombone 
Seldon Powell – tenor saxophone
Johnny Pate - horn arrangements

References

1972 albums
Muddy Waters albums
Albums produced by Esmond Edwards
Chess Records albums
Albums recorded at IBC Studios
Grammy Award for Best Ethnic or Traditional Folk Recording